Exaltation of the Holy Cross Church Greek Catholic Parish Church (UGCC) in Shvaikivtsi of the Zavodske settlement hromada of the Chortkiv Raion of the Ternopil Oblast.

History 
The first written mention of the parish, then still Orthodox and subordinate to the Patriarchate of Constantinople, dates back to the XI-XIII centuries.

1732-1733 - the general visit of the parish was made by Fr. Sylvester Malsky, OSBM.

"The village of Shvaykivtsi is the heir of Mr. Makovetsky, the hunter of Luchytsky. In that village the parish priest Fr. The Church of the Exaltation of the Holy Cross is made of moderate structure, covered with straw. The throne on the pillar is covered in any way. The belfry is made of linen, the bell tower is knitted on pillars, beaten with shingles, there are four bells on it - the first worth 14 broken thalers, the second - ten, the third - forty gold , the fourth - four thalers. The cemetery is scorched. The fraternity is guided only by points".

1734 - the temple was built. The donors are parishioners of the village of Shvaykivtsi.

1758 - the church is rebuilt (blessing date unknown). On November 20 of the same year, Fr. Anthony Onufrievich.

"The Church of the Exaltation of the Holy Cross is built with three domes and three crosses of good structure, beaten with shingles, with a floor, but not yet blessed. The altar is large with the image of Ave. Virgin Mary of snitching work, painted. The throne is proportional, covered with three tablecloths, including antimins with relics. Antepedia is covered with embossed canvas. The ark is closed, painted. It contains a tin cannon for storing the Holy Gifts. A pair of large wooden lanterns is painted red and a pair of smaller unpainted ones. The altar behind the altar is covered with tablecloths, with a wooden cross on it. Images - painted deisus (iconostasis) with apostles, prophets, four vicarious images of carpentry. Three banners on the canvas. Painted wooden processional cross. Door to the church with a lock. The bell tower with a firt in the roofs needs repair. It has four bells. The cemetery is poorly fenced. * Church books: Gospel of Lviv, Mshal Univ, Apostle of Lviv, Trifoloy, Oktoih, both Triodions of Lviv, Written Community, Trebnyk Univ, Chasoslov Lviv, three Deities. There are three metrics. Pastor Fr. Andriy Yaremovych was ordained by the illustrious Fr. Athanasius Sheptytsky, Metropolitan of All Russia and instituted in 1743 on the gift of Mr. Konstantin Franciszek of Brzez Liantskoronski, a swordsman of Hoszczyn from April 18, 1743".

XVIII-1946 - the parish was Greek Catholic. From 1946 to 1957 the parish and the church belonged to the ROC.

1958-1989 - the church was closed by the Soviet authorities.

1989-1990 - the parish and the church again belonged to the ROC.

1990 - The church returns to the UGCC. As the parish and the church are subsidiaries, priests from the parish of the village of Hadynkivtsi served here.

2004 - on the Independence Day of Ukraine, the chapel of All Saints of the Ukrainian people was consecrated.

On the territory of the village there is a monument to St. Florian - the guardian, built at the expense of Mr. Rodorf in 1864, as well as a monument to the Blessed Martyr Hieromonk Vitaly Bayrak, OSBM, consecrated by Bishop Irina Bilyk.

The parish includes all the peasants of which there are 150 people.

The altar fraternity operates at the church. Catechesis in the church is conducted by a priest.

Abbots 
 at. Ivan Melchan (1718—1743),
 at. Litinsky,
 at. Stefan Savichevsky,
 at. Makar Savichevsky (1784-1817),
 at. Mykhailo Struminsky,
 at. Jacob Shankowski,
 at. Ivan Senatovich (1838-1840),
 at. Semyon Lukasevich (1840-1842),
 at. Alexei Navrotsky (1842-1843),
 at. Philip Galinatius (1843-1844, 1845-1847),
 at. Dmitry Khodorovsky (1844-1845),
 at. Mykola Chaplinsky (1847-1848),
 at. Jacob Gorbachevsky (1848-1850),
 at. Tom Boratynsky (1850-1855),
 at. Ivan Korniy (1855-1890),
 at. Kliment Sonevytsky (1891-1928),
 at. Dean Vasyl Kvik (since 1990).

References

Sources 
 Парафія с. Швайківці. Церква Воздвиження Чесного Хреста Господнього // Бучацька єпархія УГКЦ. Парафії, монастирі, храми. Шематизм / Автор концепції Куневич Б.; керівник проекту, науковий редактор Стоцький Я. — Тернопіль : ТОВ «Новий колір», 2014. — С. 179. : іл. — ISBN 978-966-2061-30-7.
 Слободян, В. До історії сіл Гадинківці та Швайківці і їх церков // Християнська сакральна традиція: Віра, духовність, мистецтво. Матеріали ІI Міжнародної наукової конференції, м. Львів, 24-25 листопада 2010 р. (Апологет). — Львів, 2010. — С. 245—265.
 Анісомова, М. Пустімо в серце чесноти Мудрості, Віри, Надії й Любові // Голос народу. — 2012. — № 27 (29 червня). — С. 5. — (Істини).

Churches in Ukraine